Anne Gainsford, Lady Zouche (died c.1590) was a close friend and lady-in-waiting to Queen consort Anne Boleyn.

She was in the household of Anne Boleyn, as early as 1528 before the latter became the second wife of Henry VIII of England five years later. She served Anne Boleyn before and after her own marriage to Sir George Zouche of Codnor. According to one source, It was Anne to whom Anne Boleyn lent her proscribed copy of William Tyndale's The Obedience of a Christian Man. After it was stolen in jest by her bethrothed, George Zouche, it fell into the hands of Cardinal Thomas Wolsey. After its return, Anne Boleyn persuaded the King to read the book.

Following Anne Boleyn's marriage to the King in 1533, Anne remained in her service as her lady-in-waiting.

George Wyatt, the first biographer of Anne Boleyn, compiled his book on the Queen largely based on information provided by the reminiscences of Anne Gainsford.

Anne Boleyn's household 
Anne Gainsford was born on an unknown date in Crowhurst, Surrey, England, a daughter of John Gainsford by his second wife, Anne Hawte, the daughter of Richard Haute (d. 8 April 1487) and Elizabeth Tyrrell, widow of Sir Robert Darcy (c.1420 - 2 November 1469) of Maldon, Essex, and daughter of Sir Thomas Tyrrell (d. 28 March 1477) of Heron in East Horndon, Essex. She had a sister, Mary.

Sometime before 1528, she entered the household of Anne Boleyn, who was being courted by King Henry VIII. She served as Anne Boleyn's waiting-woman, and was referred to by her mistress as Nan, which was the popular diminutive of the name Anne in the 16th century.

In 1528, according to biographer George Wyatt, an incident occurred at Court in which Anne Boleyn lent Anne her copy of William Tyndale's The Obedience of a Christian Man, a book that Cardinal Wolsey had proscribed. When it was taken from her hands in jest by her betrothed Sir George Zouche, it was later discovered in the latter's possession by Richard Sampson, Dean of the Chapel Royal, who promptly took it to his master, Cardinal Wolsey. When Anne Boleyn was informed of this, instead of being angry with Anne Gainsford for allowing it to fall into Wolsey's hands, she remarked that it would be "the dearest book that ever dean or cardinal took away", and swiftly sought out the King and complained about its confiscation by Wolsey. As soon as the book was returned to her, by the King's orders, Anne Boleyn persuaded the King "most tenderly" to read the book himself, which he did and was duly impressed. He described it as a book "for me and all kings to read". It was therefore through the carelessness of Anne Gainsford that Henry VIII managed to read Tyndale's banned book which denounced papal power in favour of that of secular rulers.

There was another incident at Court in which Anne Gainsford played a minor part. In 1530, a book of ancient prophecies appeared in Anne Boleyn's apartments, which when opened showed three crude drawings representing the King, Catherine of Aragon, and Anne Boleyn. The figure of Anne lacked a head. When Anne Gainsford was shown the book with its drawings by her mistress, she allegedly remarked, "If I thought it true, though he were an emperor, I would not myself marry him". Whereas Anne Boleyn, according to Anne, dismissed the book as a bauble.

In 1533, Anne's mistress became Queen of England and she remained a part of Anne Boleyn's household as one of her ladies-in-waiting. That same year she married Sir George Zouche, who became a gentleman pensioner to the King. Three years later in 1536 Queen Anne was charged with High Treason and adultery. Following the Queen's execution, she went on the serve the latter's successor, Jane Seymour in the same capacity as lady-in-waiting.

Later years 
Anne and Sir George made their principal home at Codnor Castle, Derbyshire and they had eight children. There is no evidence to substantiate the claim that her contemporary Bess of Hardwick was raised by Anne in her household.

Her children included:
 John Zouch of Codnor
 Margaret Zouch, who married Augustine Babington of Normanton (died 1559).
 George Zouch
 William Zouch
 Lucy, Frances, Anne, and Audrey.

Sir George Zouch is said to have died in 1557, and Anne Gainsford died in about 1590. Some sources say George Zouch lived longer than Anne, and married Helen Lane after Anne's death.

At the end of the 16th century, George Wyatt, grandson of poet Sir Thomas Wyatt, and one of Anne Boleyn's first biographers, compiled his work largely from the reminiscences of Anne Gainsford. It was she who related to him the incident about Tyndale's book.

Notes

References

English ladies-in-waiting
1590 deaths
16th-century English women
Year of birth unknown
People from Surrey (before 1889)
Household of Anne Boleyn